ATOT, atot, or variant, may refer to:

 AT-OT, a type of Imperial Walker from the Star Wars fictional universe
 Association of Taiwanese Organizations in Toronto, see Taiwanese Canadian Association of Toronto
 atot, AnandTech Off-Topic
Attack On Titan, Japanese Manga by Hajime Isayama